Freedom Road was a 1979 American TV historical drama mini-series starring boxer Muhammad Ali and Kris Kristofferson, based on the 1944 novel by Howard Fast and directed by Jan Kadar. Running for four hours, it was first broadcast on NBC on October 29 and 30, 1979.

Plot
Ali plays ex-slave Gideon Jackson, a former Union soldier who returns to his home in South Carolina following the American Civil War and ultimately becomes a U.S. senator. The film and Fast's novel are based on a true story, but they take a number of liberties. (Jackson was also the inspiration for the villain in D. W. Griffith's racist propaganda film The Birth of a Nation.)

Initially representing black ex-slaves at the state's constitutional convention, Jackson is elected to the state legislature and eventually to the U.S. Senate despite opposition from white landowners, law enforcement, and the Ku Klux Klan. Kristofferson plays sharecropper Abner Lait, who helps Jackson unite former slaves and white tenant farmers.

Production
The cast also included Barbara O. Jones (as Jackson's wife), Ron O'Neal, Edward Herrmann, John McLiam (as Ulysses S. Grant), Sonny Jim Gaines, Joel Fluellen, Grace Zabriskie and Alfre Woodard. It was narrated by Ossie Davis.

It was the final film of director Jan Kadar, who died in June 1979. It had a $7 million budget and was filmed around Natchez, Mississippi because of the historic property in the area.

Critical reaction
The St Petersburg Times found that Ali was not entirely convincing but showed potential and that his quiet performance failed to convey Jackson's charisma. The Encyclopedia of Television Film Directors calls it "intermittently compelling".

See also
Muhammad Ali in media and popular culture

References

External links

1979 American television series debuts
1970s American drama television series
1970s American television miniseries
Muhammad Ali
Television series based on novels
NBC original programming
Television shows set in South Carolina